The 1999 Sudirman Cup was the 6th tournament of the World Mixed Team Badminton Championships. It was held from May 10 to May 15, 1999, in Copenhagen, Denmark.

Teams
50 teams around the world took part in this tournament, Zambia also entered but did not play in the tournament.

Group 1

Group A

Group B

Relegation playoff

Knockout stage

Semi-finals

Final

Group 2

Subgroup 2A

Subgroup 2B

Playoff

Group 3

Subgroup 3A

Subgroup 3B

Playoff

Group 4

Subgroup 4A

Subgroup 4B

Playoff

Group 5

Subgroup 5A

Subgroup 5B

Playoff

Group 6

Subgroup 6A

Subgroup 6B

Playoff

Group 7

Final classification

References

External links
Smash: Sudirman Cup
Badminton, Basket, Cykling, Floorball, Golf, Tennis.
SudirmanCup Sudirman Cup 1999 Kopenhagen, Dänemark

Sudirman Cup
Sudirman Cup
Sudirman Cup
Sudirman Cup
Badminton tournaments in Denmark